The Italian Somali Divisions were two divisions of colonial soldiers from Italian Somaliland that were formed as part of the  (Italian Army) Royal Corps of Colonial Troops during the Second World War.

History
After June 1940, when the Kingdom of Italy declared war on the Allies, two divisions of Somali soldiers were raised in Italian Somaliland. The divisions' initial personnel were drawn mainly from some of the colonial brigades that had fought in the conquest of Ethiopia in 1936. But soon after their formation, new recruits were enlisted in order to meet the numbers required for a standard Italian division (around 7,000 soldiers). These recruits received training by Italian NCOs, although this was interrupted in the early stages of the war by the construction of a small new  railway between Villabruzzi and the Ethiopian frontier. As a result, at the start of World War II there were 20,458 Somali soldiers in Italian Somaliland, mostly in these two new divisions, but they were not well trained for combat.

At the end of 1940, the 1st Somali Division, commanded by General Carnevali, was sent to defend the Juba river in western Italian Somaliland, in response to Italian concerns of a British attack from British Kenya. The 2nd Somali Division, commanded by General Santini, remained initially in the area of Mogadishu as a possible reserve force, before moving to the Gelib area in February 1941.

In the first days of February 1941 the British attacked the Juba front and after heavy fighting the 101 Divisione Somala, although reinforced by some units of the 102 Divisione Somala, was half destroyed. General Carlo De Simone, commander-in-chief of all Italian forces in Italian Somaliland, ordered the division’s retreat toward Ethiopia. General Baccari subsequently replaced Carnevali, after the latter was wounded in combat and became sick.

While in southern Ethiopia, the division was practically dismantled on March 7, when the few surviving brigades reached Harar in central Ethiopia. Successively some of the 101 Somali Division's Italian officers fought in the reduct of Gondar until November 1941.

The "102 Divisione Somala", consisting mainly of new recruits who were not well trained for combat, retreated to Ethiopia after the British crossed the Juba river, following heavy clashes.

The soldiers of this colonial division fought hard around Gelib, rolling up the Juba river but were forced to retreat by the better-equipped British force. The division  was dismantled in the Ogaden area. Some of its soldiers – mainly the Italian officers – retreated to "Passo Marda" south of Addis Ababa where they made a last stand.

Organization

101st Somali Division 
 101st Somali Division, in Jilib – Brigadier-General Italo Carnevali
 XX Colonial Brigade, in Baidoa – Colonel Giuseppe Azzolini
 XL Colonial Battalion
 LXXIV Colonial Battalion
 LXXV Colonial Battalion
 LXXVI Colonial Battalion
 XX Colonial Artillery Group (65/17 field guns)
 20th Colonial Cavalry Squadron
 20th Mixed Colonial Engineer Company
 20th Colonial Field Hospital
 20th Colonial Supply Column
 XCI Colonial Brigade, in Jilib – Colonel Alfredo Baccari
 LXXV Colonial Battalion
 CXCIV Colonial Battalion
 CXCVI Colonial Battalion
 XCI Colonial Artillery Group (70/15 field guns)
 91st Colonial Cavalry Squadron
 91st Mixed Colonial Engineer Company
 91st Colonial Field Hospital
 91st Colonial Supply Column

102nd Somali Division 
 102nd Somali Division, in Barawa – Brigadier-General Santini
 XCII Colonial Brigade, in Barawa – Colonel Giaume
 LXXIV Colonial Battalion
 CXCI Colonial Battalion
 CXCII Colonial Battalion
 XCII Colonial Artillery Group (70/15 field guns)
 92nd Colonial Cavalry Squadron
 92nd Mixed Colonial Engineer Company
 92nd Colonial Field Hospital
 92nd Colonial Supply Column

See also
 Italian East Africa
 Regio Esercito

Notes

Bibliography

 
 

Divisions of Italy in World War II
Military units and formations established in 1940
Military units and formations disestablished in 1941